Al-Jaroudiya (or just Jaroudiya) is a village situated in the Qatif region in the Eastern Province of Saudi Arabia. Other villages in Qatif such as Saihat, Anak, Safwa, Awamiya, Awjam, Qudaih, Khuwailidiya, Al-Jish, Umm Al-Hamam, as well as Tarout Island (which includes the districts of Sanabis and Darin). Jaroudiya is located in north-west Umm Al-Hammam, close to Badr-el-Badrani which was a place for pilgrims resting when camel was a means for transport across the deserts. Jaroudiya also rests on top of the Sald mountains. Original families resulting are referred to as Jaroudi, or Jarudi, or Al-Jaroudi. For more details visit the official site of Al-Jarodiah village 

Populated places in Eastern Province, Saudi Arabia